The 1946 All-Southwest Conference football team consists of American football players chosen by the Associated Press (AP) and the United Press (UP) as the best players at each position among teams playing in the Southwest Conference during the 1946 college football season. 

In the UP voting, Texas quarterback Bobby Layne received the highest total with 38 points. Rice guard Weldon Humble ranked second with 37 points. Humble and Texas end Hub Bechtol were also consensus picks for the 1943 All-America college football team.

All Southwest selections

Backs
 Bobby Layne, Texas (AP-1, UP-1)
 Clyde Scott, Arkansas (AP-1, UP-1)
 Carl Russ, Rice (AP-1, UP-1)
 Huey Keeney, Rice (AP-1, UP-1)
 Jim Canady, Texas (AP-2, UP-2)
 Virgil Eikenberg (AP-2, UP-2)
 Ken Holland, Arkansas (AP-2, UP-2)
 Aubrey Fowler, Arkansas (AP-2)
 Willie Zapalac, Texas A&M (UP-2)

Ends
 Gene Wilson, SMU (AP-1, UP-1)
 Alton Baldwin, Arkansas (AP-1, UP-1)
 Hub Bechtol, Texas (AP-2, UP-2)
 Win Williams, Rice (AP-2, UP-2)

Tackles
 Weldon Edwards, TCU (AP-1, UP-1)
 Charles Lively, Arkansas (AP-1, UP-2)
 Charles Malmberg, Rice (AP-2, UP-1)
 Monte Moncrief, Texas A&M (AP-2, UP-2)

Guards
 Weldon Humble, Rice (AP-1, UP-1)
 Jim Sid Wright, SMU (AP-1, UP-1)
 Spot Collins, Texas (AP-2, UP-2)
 Odell Stautzenberger, Texas A&M (AP-2, UP-2)

Centers
 Dick Harris, Texas (AP-1, UP-1)
 Bill Thomas, Arkansas (AP-2, UP-2)

Key

See also
1946 College Football All-America Team

References

All-Southwest Conference
All-Southwest Conference football teams